The Golden Bear Tour was an American third-tier professional golf tour.

The tour existed from 1996 through 2005, when it purchased by the Gateway Tour.  It was run by the 'Golden Bear', golfing legend Jack Nicklaus.

Sources
Nicklaus.com

Professional golf tours